Patryk Mikita (born 28 December 1993) is a Polish professional footballer who plays as a forward for GKS Tychy.

References

External links
 

1993 births
Living people
Polish footballers
Poland youth international footballers
Poland under-21 international footballers
Association football forwards
Polonia Warsaw players
Legia Warsaw II players
Legia Warsaw players
Widzew Łódź players
Ząbkovia Ząbki players
Chojniczanka Chojnice players
Siarka Tarnobrzeg players
Radomiak Radom players
OKS Stomil Olsztyn players
GKS Tychy players
Ekstraklasa players
I liga players
II liga players
III liga players
Footballers from Warsaw